Telangana State Archaeology Museum or Hyderabad Museum is a museum located in Hyderabad, India. It is the oldest museum in Hyderabad.

History 
Archaeologist Henry Cousens first explored the site in the beginning of the 19th century, and around 1940 the mound was excavated under the supervision of  Nizam of Hyderabad. The excavated items were placed in a museum  built on the ancient site. In 1952, the museum's contents were moved to the current building, under the administrative control of Archaeological Survey of India.

In 1930, (Nizam VII) Mir Osman Ali Khan, who wanted to preserve the Hyderabad's state's heritage, had named the museum as Hyderabad Museum.

It was named as Andhra Pradesh State Archaeology Museum in 1960.

In 2008, a sword belonging to the Nizam and other artifacts were stolen from the museum.

After the bifurcation of Andhra Pradesh and Telangana in 2014, the museum was renamed Telangana State Archeology Museum.

Collection

Egyptian 
This museum's most popular attraction is its Egyptian mummy of Princess Naishu which was brought in 1930 to Hyderabad by Nasir Nawaz Jung, the son-in-law of Asaf Jah VI. He presented it to the Asaf Jah VII, who donated it to the museum. He had reportedly bought it for 1000 pounds. It is one of the six Egyptian mummies in India, the others being in Lucknow, Mumbai, Vadodara, Jaipur, and Kolkata.

The mummy, which previously was deteriorating, was restored in 2016 and placed in an oxygen-free case.

Indian 
There is a huge gallery on Buddha dating back to the last century. The museum has a wide variety of archaeological artifacts from the Nizam and Kakatiya dynasty.

Gallery

See also
 Nizam's Museum

References

External links

AP State Archaeological Museum in Hyderabad. http://hyderabadattractions.com/?p=244.

Art museums and galleries in India
India
Museums in Hyderabad, India
Hyderabad State
Archaeological museums in India
Heritage structures in Hyderabad, India
Museums established in 1930
1930 establishments in India
State museums in India